The 1974 Baylor Bears football team represented the Baylor University in the 1974 NCAA Division I football season. Baylor won eight games and captured the Southwest Conference (SWC) championship for the first time since 1924, and in the process defeated the Texas by a score of 34–24 after rallying from a 24–7 halftime deficit. It was Baylor's first victory over the Longhorns in 17 years. The 1974 season and the win over Texas are commonly referred to as the "Miracle on the Brazos" (after the Brazos River, which runs near the Baylor campus) and it remains part of Baylor lore.

Schedule

Team players drafted into the NFL
The following players were drafted into professional football following the season.

Awards and honors
 Grant Teaff, AFCA Coach of the Year

References

Baylor
Southwest Conference football champion seasons
Baylor Bears football seasons
Baylor Bears football